United Nations is the debut from supergroup United Nations. The band features members from numerous prolific bands, such as Geoff Rickly of Thursday. Due to contractual obligations of other members, the official lineup of the band is not known.

Release 
The album received a limited edition CD release that was only available through the Eyeball Records webstore. Only 1,000 copies were sold. The album was not released in stores because of copyright issues with the cover image, which is essentially the same image used for The Beatles' Abbey Road, but with The Beatles engulfed in flames. One retail store, Hot Topic destroyed about 7000 copies of the CDs because the store had ordered the album without knowing about the album's copyright violations, due to a no return policy the store could not return them. Staff from the store sent pictures to the band of themselves destroying the CDs. The album was also released on vinyl, pressing was limited to 1,000 copies on red vinyl.

2015 Reissue 
In 2015, Temporary Residence Limited and Rickley's label Collect Records reissued the album on vinyl with updated packaging that parodied The Beatles' 1968 self-titled album. The reissue contained a sticker which read:"Cease& Desist& Destroy& Reissue. The controversial debut album reissued with original banned artwork. Now expanded for maximum litigation. Includes infinite bonus track with high-quality download. Limited edition until we get sued. Again."

Track listing

Notes
 The song "Subliminal Testing" can be played backwards to reveal other lyrics that simply tell the listener to turn the song back around.
 The hidden track is 12:59 of silence, followed by the sound of a cash register.

Personnel

United NationsDue to contractual obligations the official lineup of the band is not known.

Additional musicians
Billy Horn – tenor saxophone on track 11
Production
Executive Producer Tim Gilles
Mixed by Matt Messenger
Mastered by Alan Douches at West West Side Music
Tracked by Kevin Neaton
Additional Tracking by Al Eddings and Matt Messenger
Assisted by Juan Martinez, Giavonni Escamilla, and Matt Menafro

Artwork
Artwork by Sons of Nero
Design (on reissue) by Jeremy DeVine

Charts

References

2008 debut albums
United Nations (band) albums
Albums with cover art by Sons of Nero
Powerviolence albums